Shin Eun-jung (born January 3, 1974) is a South Korean actress. She has played supporting roles in television dramas such as The Legend (2007), East of Eden (2008) and Faith (2012).

Filmography

Television series

Web series

Film

Variety show

Awards and nominations

References

External links 
 
 Shin Eun-jung Fan Cafe at Daum 
 
 
 

1974 births
Living people
South Korean television actresses
South Korean film actresses
Seoul Institute of the Arts alumni
People from Busan